Logănești is a village in Hîncești District, Moldova.

The 2004 census found a population of 4119, of whom nearly 99% declared as Moldovan.

References

Villages of Hîncești District